The Navesti (also known as Pala or Paala) is a -long-river in southwestern Estonia. It is the largest river by discharge that empties into the Pärnu (in its mouth the discharge is almost equal as Pärnu's). The source of the Navesti is near Imavere (between the villages of Jalametsa and Käsukonna) in Järva County. It flows generally west, and passes through three counties (Järva, Viljandi and Pärnu). Its confluence with the Pärnu is located near Tori in Jõesuu.

Before the opening of the primeval Lake Võrtsjärv through the Emajõgi to the Lake Peipus, the Navesti river drained the Võrtsjärv.

Fishes
There are up to 18 species of fish in the Navesti, including: bream, burbot, chub, dace, ide, perch, pike, river trout, roach and ruffe.

References

Rivers of Estonia
Landforms of Pärnu County
Landforms of Viljandi County
Landforms of Järva County